Antodice lezamai is a species of beetle in the family Cerambycidae. It was described by McCarty in 2006.

References

Antodice
Beetles described in 2006